Sinclairtown railway station served the suburb of Sinclairtown, Fife, Scotland from 1847 to 1969 on the Edinburgh and Northern Railway.

History 
The station opened on 17 September 1847 by the Edinburgh and Northern Railway. The goods yard was to the west and the signal box was on the west side of the eastbound platform. Another goods yard was built to the south. A siding further to the west served Dunniker Colliery. The first site of the station closed in 1909 and was relocated later in the year. The signal box was moved west of the goods yard. The station closed on 1 January 1917 but reopened again on 2 March 1919 before finally closing on 6 October 1969.

References 

Disused railway stations in Fife
Former North British Railway stations
Railway stations in Great Britain opened in 1847
Railway stations in Great Britain closed in 1917
Railway stations in Great Britain opened in 1919
Railway stations in Great Britain closed in 1969
1847 establishments in Scotland
1969 disestablishments in Scotland